Rio Mitcham (born 30 August 1999) is a British track and field athlete who competes as a sprinter.

Career
He won a silver medal at the England Athletics u23 Championship in June 2021 in the 400 metres. In July 2022 at the British Championships Mitcham ran a personal best to qualify for the final and then secured a bronze medal in the final with an improved personal best time of 44.92.

He was a member of the British relay team that ran in the 2022 European Athletics Championships – Men's 4 × 400 metres relay, winning gold in Munich.

Personal life
He was an alumnus of Loughborough University. In 2022 Mitchum competed in the eleventh series of the music reality TV show The Voice performing as Smokiecoco with his brother Alex. The brothers were successful in their initial audition, joining Will.i.am's team for the latter stages of the competition.

References

External Links

 1999 births
Living people
British male sprinters
English male sprinters
20th-century British people
21st-century British people
Black British sportsmen
European Athletics Championships winners